Kelly Schmidt (born August 26, 1962) is an American politician who served as the 33rd North Dakota treasurer from 2005 to 2021. She is the longest-serving treasurer in North Dakota's history and a member of the Republican Party.

Electoral history

Notes

1962 births
21st-century American politicians
21st-century American women politicians
Living people
North Dakota Republicans
People from Mandan, North Dakota
State treasurers of North Dakota
Women in North Dakota politics